Conasprella alexandremonteiroi is a species of sea snail, a marine gastropod mollusc in the family Conidae, the cone snails, cone shells or cones.

Distribution
This species occurs in the Caribbean Sea off Nicaragua.

References

 Cossignani T. (2014) Jaspidiconus alexandremonteiroi nuova specie dal Nicaragua. Malacologia Mostra Mondiale 82: 9.
  Puillandre N., Duda T.F., Meyer C., Olivera B.M. & Bouchet P. (2015). One, four or 100 genera? A new classification of the cone snails. Journal of Molluscan Studies. 81: 1-23

External links
 To World Register of Marine Species
 

alexandremonteiroi
Gastropods described in 2014